"Aldebaran" is a song recorded by Japanese-American singer-songwriter Ai, released on November 1, 2021, by EMI Records and Universal Music Group. The song served as the theme song for the Japanese television drama, Come Come Everybody and subsequently served as the third single from Ai's twelfth studio album, Dream.

Upon its release, "Aldebaran" received critical acclaim from critics for its composition and lyrics. The song debuted and peaked at number 37 on the Billboard Japan Hot 100 and number 6 on the Oricon Digital Singles Chart. In May 2022, "Aldebaran" was certified Gold by the Recording Industry Association of Japan.

Background 

On September 27 2021, Ai announced on her social media of a song she recorded for an upcoming NHK TV series. Written by Naotarō Moriyama and featuring arrangements by Neko Saito, the song is named after the star of the same name in the Taurus constellation. Regarding the song, Mone Kamishiraishi, one of the actresses to be in the film, commented that the song was "beautiful" and "nice and encouraging". Eri Fukatsu also commented she was wary of Ai's recording but stated, "My heart was shaken, robbed and filled." Actress Rina Kawaei, also an actress in the film, commented that she was "impressed by the gentle singing and the wonderful lyrics". The song was originally written by Moriyama on New Years in 2021 about environmental issues and was originally titled "Daphnia Pulex". "Aldebaran" was not intended to be the theme song for Come Come Everybody until Moriyama allowed Ai to record the song with reworked lyrics.

Promotion 
To promote "Aldebaran", Ai was to appear on NHK's Utacon to preview the song on September 28, 2021, however the event was cancelled and moved to October 4 due to an emergency deceleration. Universal Japan issued a compilation chapter titled Self Selection "Piano Ballad" on the same day the single was announced. On TikTok, a 30 second television version was released to the service. On October 4, a radio edit of "Aldebaran" was sent to Japanese radio stations. An official audio of the radio edit was uploaded to Ai's YouTube channel. On October 26, Ai performed the song on an NHK broadcast show.

Commercial performance 
"Aldebaran" debuted at number 5 on the Oricon Daily Digital Singles chart on November 2. The song later peaked at number 4 on the Daily Digital Singles chart. On the weekly Oricon Digital Singles chart, "Aldebaran" debuted at number 11. For the week of November 16, 2021, "Aldebaran" reached a new peak at number 6 with 8,331 total downloads. On the Billboard Japan Hot 100, "Aldebaran" debuted and peaked at number 37. "Aldebaran" marked Ai's first appearance on the Billboard Japan Hot 100 since her 2017 single, "Kira Kira". In March 2022, "Aldebaran" peaked at number 12 on the Billboard Japan Top User Generated Songs chart. The song was later ranked at number 29 on the Billboard Japan Top Download Songs year-end chart for 2022.

Accolades

Music video 
A music video for "Aldebaran" was announced on October 25, 2021 and premiered on YouTube on November 5.

Live performances 
Ai performed "Aldebaran" on the day of its release during her 20th anniversary tour It's All Me at the Tokyo International Forum Hall. Ai performed "Aldebaran" at the 72nd NHK Kōhaku Uta Gassen on December 31, her fourth appearance on the show. Ai appeared on 193rd episode of The First Take, a YouTube channel where singers perform a song recorded in one take. She performed an excerpt of "Story" prior to "Aldebaran". It marked her first appearance on the channel.

Charts

Weekly charts

Year-end charts

Credits and personnel 

Credits adapted from Dream liner notes and Tidal.
 Ai Carina Uemura – lead vocals, production
 Naotarō Moriyama – songwriting
 Neko Saito – production, arranging
 Midorin – drums
 Tomohiko Ohkanda – bass
 Fumio Yanagisawa – guitar
 Satoshi Onoue – guitar
 Hideaki "Lanbsy" Sakai – latin percussion
 Tomoyuki Asakawa – harp
 Great Eida – concertmaster, strings
 Jo Kuwata – violin
 Nagisa Kiriyama – violin
 Haruko Yano – violin
 Yukinori Murata – violin
 Akane Irie – violin
 Ayumu Koshikawa – violin
 Akiko Maruyama – violin
 Yui Kaneko – violin
 Masahiro Miyake – violin
 Yuji Yamada – viola
 Mayu Takashima – viola
 Ayano Kasahara – cello
 Yoshihiko Maeda – cello

Certifications

Release history

Notes

References 

2021 singles
2021 songs
Ai (singer) songs
EMI Records singles
Universal Music Group singles
Universal Music Japan singles
Japanese television drama theme songs
Songs about friendship
2020s ballads
Song recordings produced by Ai (singer)